Rockson-Nelson Etse Kwami Dafeamekpor is a Ghanaian politician and the Member of Parliament representing the South Dayi constituency in the Volta Region. He is a member of the National Democratic Congress.

Early life and education
Dafeamekpor obtained a B.Sc. degree in tourism from the University of Cape Coast. He also completed the LL. B. at the University of Ghana. He proceeded to the Ghana School of Law where he qualified as a Barrister-at-Law.

Work
Prior to becoming an MP, Dafeamekpor was a Senior Associate at the Hayibor, Djarbeng and Company law firm based at Kokomlemle, a suburb of Accra.

Politics
He first entered parliament following the 2016 Ghanaian general election where he won the seat with 71.44% of the votes. This gave him an eight percent majority. In the 2020 general election, he retained his seat with a reduced majority of 1.26%, having won 72.7% of the total votes cast.

Personal life
Dafeamekpor is a Christian and he is married with four children.

Accident 
On 14 August 2021, it was reported he was involved in an accident on the Aveyime road in the Volta region. His vehicle was claimed to have somersaulted two times after a Kia truck crossed his envoy and crashed his vehicle. He was later released from the 37 Military Hospital after he receiving treatment.

References

1976 births
Living people
National Democratic Congress (Ghana) politicians
Ghanaian MPs 2017–2021
University of Cape Coast alumni
University of Ghana alumni
Ghanaian MPs 2021–2025